Mirche Acev is a former village in Municipality of Krivogaštani. Before World War 2, its name was Petrovo. The village is also split by the Prilep Municipality.

Villages in Krivogaštani Municipality
Villages in Prilep Municipality